Cyberpsychology, Behavior, and Social Networking is a monthly peer-reviewed scientific journal covering cyberpsychology and the psychological effects of social networking services like Facebook and Twitter. It was established in 1998 as CyberPsychology & Behavior, obtaining its current name in 2010. It is published by Mary Ann Liebert, Inc. and the editor-in-chief is Brenda K. Wiederhold (Scripps Memorial Hospital). According to the Journal Citation Reports, the journal has a 2020 impact factor of 4.157.

References

External links

Publications established in 1998
Mary Ann Liebert academic journals
Monthly journals
Cyberpsychology
Social psychology journals
Human–computer interaction journals
English-language journals